The 2012 FIVB World Grand Prix was a women's volleyball tournament played by 16 countries starting 8 June 2012. The finals were held at the Beilun Sports and Arts Centre in Ningbo, China.

Competing nations

Qualification process

 [1] The best two South American teams and the best 4 NORCECA teams at the 2011 Pan-American Cup qualified.
 [2] As China already qualified as host of the Final Round, the next best three teams at the 2011 Asian Championship qualified.
 [3] The best African team and the next best Asian team at the 2011 Asian Championship had a play-off to determine the final spot.

Play-off
Venue: Palais des Sports, Oran, Algeria

Chinese Taipei wins by total points of the two legs 141–138

Squads

Pool standing procedure
1. Match points
2. Numbers of matches won
3. Sets ratio
4. Points ratio

Match won 3–0 or 3–1: 3 match points for the winner, 0 match points for the loser
Match won 3–2: 2 match points for the winner, 1 match point for the loser

Calendar
Though FIVB did not officially release or confirm the pool schedule until April 2012, almost all continental divisions posted the pool schedule in December 2011. The original list was released December 19, 2011; three days later on December 22 a new list was released to the public, with 4 minor changes involving Brazil's, Dominican Republic's and Germany's Pools. In April 2012 FIVB confirmed officially the pool schedule that was released December 22, 2011.

Preliminary round

Ranking
China (finals host) and the top five teams in the preliminary round will advance to the Final round.

All times are local for the host city.

First round

Pool A
Venue: Macau Forum, Macau, China

Pool B
Venue: Palacio del Voleibol, Santo Domingo, Dominican Republic

Pool C
Venue: Sajik Indoor Gymnasium, Busan, South Korea

Pool D
Venue: Atlas Arena, Łódź, Poland

Second round

Pool E
Venue: Adib Moises Dib Gymnasium, São Bernardo do Campo, Brazil

Pool F
Venue: Park Arena Komaki, Komaki, Japan

Pool G
Venue: Lingnan Pearl Gymnasium, Foshan, China

Pool H
Venue: Hala Pionir, Belgrade, Serbia

Third round

Pool I
Venue: Osaka Municipal Central Gymnasium, Osaka, Japan

Pool J
Venue: Keelawes 1 Gymnasium, Thai-Japanese Stadium, Thai-Japanese Bangkok Youth Center, Dindaeng, Bangkok, Thailand

Pool K
Venue: Luohe Sports Center, Luohe, China

Pool L
Venue: Kaohsiung City, Chinese Taipei

Final round

Final ranking

Pool Final

Venue: Beilun Gymnasium, Ningbo, China

All times are local for the host city.

Final standing

Individual awards

Most Valuable Player:

Best Scorer:

Best Spiker:

Best Blocker:

Best Server:

Best Receiver:

Best Setter:

Best Digger:

Best Libero:

References

FIVB World Grand Prix
2012 in Chinese sport
International volleyball competitions hosted by China
2012